Lynyrd Skynyrd: I'll Never Forget You is a book written by former Lynyrd Skynyrd bodyguard Gene Odom.   It details the childhood memories Gene shared with Lynyrd Skynyrd vocalist Ronnie Van Zant.  It was followed by another book co-written with Frank Dorman, entitled "Lynyrd Skynyrd: Remembering the Free Birds of Southern Rock".

References

Book reviews

1983 non-fiction books
American biographies
Music autobiographies